Terilyn A. Shropshire is an American motion picture and television editor. She is the daughter of Thomas B. Shropshire, a corporate executive.

Her big break as a motion picture editor came when she was hired to cut Eve's Bayou, the auspicious feature directing debut of actress Kasi Lemmons.  The film went on to become the highest grossing independent film of 1997, and it received numerous awards including Best First Feature at the Independent Spirit Awards. In the wake of Eve's Bayou, Shropshire is a much in demand editor.

Shropshire has received an Eddie Award from the American Cinema Editors and has been nominated for an Emmy Award. She has been elected as a member of the American Cinema Editors.

Filmography
 Beyond the Lights (2014)
 Among Ravens (2014)
 The Old Guard (2020)
 Bruised (2021)
 The Woman King (2022)

References

External links

American Cinema Editors
Living people
Year of birth missing (living people)
American film editors